An idioventricular rhythm is a cardiac rhythm characterized by a rate of <50 beats per minute (bpm), absence of P waves and widening of the QRS complex. Causes of idioventricular rhythms are varied and can include drugs or a heart defect at birth. It is typically benign and not life-threatening.

Etiology
Various etiologies may contribute to the formation of an idioventricular rhythm, and include:
 Heart block
 Reperfusion after myocardial infarction
 Electrolyte abnormalities
 Heart diseases present at birth
 Certain drugs (eg. digoxin, β-agonists, anaesthetics)

Pathophysiology
The physiological pacemaker of the heart is the sinoatrial node. If the sinoatrial node is rendered dysfunctional, the AV node may act as the pacemaker. If both of these fail, the ventricles begin to act as the dominant pacemaker in the heart. The ventricles acting as their own pacemaker gives rise to an idioventricular rhythm.

Diagnosis
An ECG trace is required for diagnosis.

Treatment
As this rhythm is not life-threatening, treatment has limited value for the patient. If underlying pathologies are identified, they should be treated appropriately. Antidysrhythmics may be utilised if the patient suffers from dysrhythmias.

References

Cardiac arrhythmia